Deck the Halls is a 2006 American Christmas comedy film directed by John Whitesell, written by Matt Corman, Chris Ord, and Don Rhymer, and starring Danny DeVito, Matthew Broderick, Kristin Davis, and Kristin Chenoweth. The film was released on November 22, 2006. The film was released by 20th Century Fox Home Entertainment on DVD on November 6, 2007.

Plot 
In the fictional town of Cloverdale, Massachusetts, optometrist and self-proclaimed Christmas expert Steve Finch wants his family to have a great Christmas, filled with traditions such as using an Advent calendar, taking Christmas card pictures in matching sweaters, and buying a large tree.

In the middle of the night on December 1, new neighbors move in across the street: car salesman and electrical engineer Buddy Hall and his trophy wife Tia, both whom Steve and his wife Kelly meet the next morning. Later that day, Kelly and her daughter Madison and son Carter go to the Hall house, where they meet the Halls’ teenage twin daughters, Ashley and Emily. Tia and Kelly immediately become friends, as do Ashley, Emily, and Madison.

Buddy goes to work as a used car salesman, where he manages to sell a car to the owner of the dealership, giving him a promotion. That night, Buddy complains to Tia that while he can sell anything, he gets bored easily. After discovering that the neighborhood can be seen on satellite photos via a website called MyEarth (seemingly a parody of Google Earth), but that his house is not visible, Buddy decides to make it visible using Christmas lights. As his display grows bigger, including live animals, it gets Buddy known around town, angering Steve and threatening his position as the “Christmas guy.”

Steve’s envy towards Buddy increases; in various incidents, Steve's Christmas-card photo is ruined when two of Buddy's phonophobic feral horses get startled by the sleigh bells and take Steve for a wild ride, his car doors are ripped off during one of Buddy's light shows, and his private Christmas-tree lot is destroyed by a fire when Buddy accidentally spills gasoline with his chainsaw. Eventually, Buddy's house is completely lit, and even synchronized to music. Steve manages to sabotage Buddy’s lights by filling his fusebox with snow, but a backup generator foils his plan. Buddy discovers the sabotage and retaliates by stealing the town's Christmas tree, putting it in Steve's house, and "buying" him a car.

Buddy and Steve make a bet: if Steve beats Buddy in the WinterFest speedskating race, then Buddy removes the lights, and if Buddy beats Steve, Steve pays for the car. Buddy wins, causing Steve to yell at Buddy for being a nobody, since his house is still not visible from space. Hurt, Buddy compensates by buying a huge amount of programmable LED lights, which he pays for by hocking Tia's expensive heirloom vase, and Tia and the girls depart.

Having had enough, Steve buys various fireworks including The Atomic Warlord, a large, illegal, military-grade rocket from a gangster and tries to destroy the Hall house. The rocket misfires, setting the town Christmas tree on fire, and Steve's family leaves, but not before Kelly scolds Steve for ignoring his children to focus on Buddy.

Steve discovers Buddy has been stealing the former’s power for the latter’s lights. However, after seeing Buddy taking down his lights, a remorseful Steve forgives Buddy. The two forget their rivalry and build a winter wonderland with all of Buddy's lights. They lure Tia, Kelly, and the kids home and all sit down to a nice meal made by both Steve and Buddy.

Soon, the whole town arrives at Buddy’s house to help put Buddy's lights back up in time for a story about them on MTV. They do not work, and everyone sings carols and uses their cell phones as flashlights. As they sing, Steve accepts Buddy’s offer to be his friend, and Carter notices that the lights did not work because one of the plugs is not plugged in properly. He tightly plugs it in, causing the lights to shine brightly through the night. SuChin Pak, doing the MTV report, gets confirmation from MyEarth that the house is indeed visible from space, and the crowd celebrates.

Cast

Danny DeVito as Buddy Hall
Matthew Broderick as Dr. Steve Finch
Kristin Davis as Kelly Finch
Kristin Chenoweth as Tia Hall
Alia Shawkat as Madison Finch
Dylan Blue as Carter Finch
Jorge Garcia as Wallace
Fred Armisen as Gustave
Gillian Vigman as Gerta
Ryan Devlin as Bob Murray
Kelly Aldridge as Ashley Hall
Sabrina Aldridge as Emily Hall
Lochlyn Munro as Ted Beckham
Sean O'Bryan as Mayor Young
Jackie Burroughs as Mrs. Ryor
Garry Chalk as Sheriff Dave
Nicola Peltz as Mackenzie
Kal Penn as Amit Sayid
Cory Monteith as Madison's Date
Zak Santiago as Fireworks Dealer
Jill Krop as herself
SuChin Pak as herself

Production

Filming
The film was originally entitled All Lit Up, and while it was set in the United States, it was shot in Cloverdale, Surrey, Ocean Park, Surrey, and other locations throughout Metro Vancouver.

In the scene in which Steve and Buddy are in a speedskating race, Matthew Broderick had to train with a real Olympic speed skater trainer for a few weeks before he could film that scene. He trained at Chelsea Piers in New York.

Reception

Box office
The film grossed $35.1 million in North America and $12.1 million in other territories for a total of $47.2 million, against a budget of $51 million, making it a box office failure where it only earned back 91.8% of its total budget.

The film grossed $12 million in its opening weekend, finishing fourth at the box office.

Critical response
The site's critical consensus reads, "Relying on flat humor and a preposterous plot, Deck the Halls is an unnecessarily mean-spirited holiday movie that does little to put viewers in a holiday mood." This was the third-worst reviewed Christmas movie on the site, after The Nutcracker in 3D and Christmas with the Kranks, respectively. On Metacritic, the film has a score of 28 out of 100 based on 22 critics, indicating "generally unfavorable reviews". Audiences polled by CinemaScore gave the film an average grade of "B−" on an A+ to F scale.

Roger Moore of the Orlando Sentinel named it "A leaden slice of fruitcake, with about as much nutritional value," and concluding that "it's not worth working up a good hate over". Stephen Hunter remarked "I literally didn't count a single laugh in the whole aimless schlep," and suggested that the film should've been named Dreck the Halls instead. Michael Medved named it the "Worst Movie of 2006." Finally, Richard Roeper, co-host of the television show Ebert & Roeper, wrote:

"You can't believe how excruciatingly awful this movie is. It is bad in a way that will cause unfortunate viewers to huddle in the lobby afterward, hugging in small groups, consoling one another with the knowledge that it's over, it's over -- thank God, it's over. [...] Compared to the honest hard labor performed by tens of millions of Americans every day, a film critic's job is like a winning lottery ticket. But there IS work involved, and it can be painful -- and the next time someone tells me I have the best job in the world, I'm going to grab them by the ear, fourth-grade-teacher-in-1966-style, and drag them to see Deck the Halls."

Accolades
The film was nominated for three Golden Raspberry Awards: 
 Worst Excuse For Family Entertainment
 Worst Supporting Actor (Danny DeVito)
 Worst Supporting Actress (Kristin Chenoweth).

See also
 List of Christmas films

References

External links

 
 
 

2006 films
American Christmas comedy films
Films shot in Vancouver
Films directed by John Whitesell
Films scored by George S. Clinton
20th Century Fox films
Regency Enterprises films
2000s Christmas comedy films
Cross-dressing in American films
Films set in Massachusetts
2006 comedy films
2000s English-language films
Films produced by Arnon Milchan
2000s American films